JS Umigiri (DD-158) is an  of the Japan Maritime Self-Defense Force.

Development and design 
The Asagiri class is equipped for combat and interception missions, and is primarily armed with anti-ship weapons. They carry two of the Mk-141 Guided Missile Launching System (GMLS), which are anti-ship missile systems. The ships are also fitted to be used against submarines. They also carries Mk-32 Surface Vessel Torpedo Tubes (SVTT), which can be used as an anti-submarine weapon. The ships have two of these systems abeam to starboard and to port. They are also fitted with an Oto-Melara 62-caliber gun to be used against sea and air targets.

The ship can have up to 220 personnel on board. The ship is also fitted to accommodate for one aircraft. The ship's flight deck can be used to service a SH-60J9(K) Seahawk helicopter.

Construction and career 
Umigiri was laid down on 31 October 1988 and launched on 9 November 1989 by IHI Corporation of Tokyo. She was commissioned on 12 March 1991.

From 14 June to 1 September 1993, the destroyer participated in the US dispatch training with the escort vessels ,  and five P-3C aircraft.

In 1996, she participated in the Exercise RIMPAC 1996.

A helicopter rescued 34 crew members who were believed to be Chinese by carrying out rescue activities (all rescued together with 9 rescued by the Maritime Security Agency helicopter). On 24 March, the same year, Umigiri was transferred to the 46th Escort Corps of the 1st Escort Corps Group. On the same day, the 46th escort corps was renamed to the 5th escort corps due to the revision of the corps number.

On 26 January 2002, two people were mildly ill due to gas poisoning caused by an arson attack in an officer's bedroom. Arson set fire in the officer's bedroom on 13 March and officer's toilet on 17 May. On 6 October, a former torpedo chief was arrested after being accused of arson of existing buildings. 

On 13 March 2003, Umigiri was transferred to the 8th Escort Corps of the 4th Escort Corps, and the fixed port became Kure, and she was transferred to the same area. On 17 March 2014, as the 18th dispatched anti-piracy action surface corps, sailed from Kure base to the Gulf of Aden off the coast of Somalia with the escort ship , Umagiri engaged in missions until August of the same year. She returned to Japan on 20 August.

From 15 March to 28 May 2016, the destroyer participated in the Japan-Australia joint training conducted in the waters around Sydney with the escort ship  and the submarine .

She came in contact with a tanker with an unknown ship registration labeled Myeongryu 1 and confirmed that she was performing what appears to be "ship-to-ship", which is prohibited by a UN Security Council resolution. SAM JONG 2 is a vessel designated by the United Nations Security Council North Korea Sanctions Committee as a target of asset freeze and port entry ban in March 2018.

Gallery

References 

Asagiri-class destroyers
Ships built by IHI Corporation
1989 ships